Garzia de' Medici (July 5, 1547 – December 6, 1562) was the son of Cosimo I de' Medici, Grand Duke of Tuscany, and Eleanor of Toledo. He was the subject of a famous painting by Bronzino when he was an infant. He was born in Florence and died of malaria along with his mother while traveling to Pisa, a few days after his brother, Cardinal Giovanni, also died of the disease.

Early years 
Born in Florence, he was the son of Cosimo I de' Medici, Grand Duke of Tuscany, and Eleanor of Toledo. His parents had planned for him a military career, and at only 13 years old  he had been named Honorary Commander and Supreme Commander of the Tuscan galleys.

Malaria and death 
In 1562, he accompanied his father and brothers Giovanni and Ferdinando, to the Tuscan coast to embark to Spain, where the eldest son Francesco lived. But his mother Eleanor and the children contracted malaria, and all except Ferdinando died in a few weeks.

Many of sudden deaths in the family of the Duke immediately aroused the suspicions of the family, who also attended the Council of Trent. Several sources confirm, however, that during the period there was a violent flu epidemic.

Centuries after his death, a myth arose saying that Garzia had murdered his brother, Giovanni, following a dispute in 1562. In turn, his father Cosimo, furious, killed Garzia with his own sword. However, modern exhumations showed no signs of violence on the bodies and they were found to have died together of malaria in 1562.

Ancestry

Notes

1547 births
1562 deaths
Garzia
16th-century Italian nobility
Deaths from malaria
Burials at San Lorenzo, Florence
Garzia de' Medici
Royalty and nobility who died as children
Sons of monarchs